Kök-Say is a village in the Talas Region of Kyrgyzstan. It is part of the Kara-Buura District. Its population was 4,991 in 2021.

References

Populated places in Talas Region